The National Sports Organisation is intended by the Government of India to promote the development of athletics and sporting activities of the nation's youth.

It is present in many important institutions of India such as the IITs and IIMs.

Sports organisations of India